Estádio Universitário São Paulo is a multi-use stadium located in São Paulo, Brazil. It is used mostly for football matches and hosts the home matches of University of São Paulo. It was built in 1954. The stadium has a capacity of 30,000 people.

References

Universitario Sao Paulo
University of São Paulo
Sports venues in São Paulo
Sports venues completed in 1954
1954 establishments in Brazil